West Beacon is the prominent western peak, rising to 2,345 m in Beacon Heights, in the Quartermain Mountains, Victoria Land. The name "Beacon Height West" was first used by the Discovery expedition (1901–04). The name was shortened by the New Zealand Geological Survey Antarctic Expedition (NZGSAE), 1958–59.

Mountains of Victoria Land
Scott Coast